Fort Rouge (French for "Red Fort") can refer to:

 Fort Rouge - a French fortress in the Napoleonic Wars protecting Calais
 Fort Rouge (fortification), a fortification built on the Assiniboine River near the Forks
 Fort Rouge, Winnipeg, a city neighborhood in Winnipeg, Manitoba, Canada
 Fort Rouge (electoral district), a provincial electoral district in Manitoba
 Agra Fort, a walled palatial city in India also known as the "Red Fort"

See also

 
 Fort (disambiguation)
 Rouge (disambiguation)